Flat warts, technically known as Verruca plana, are reddish-brown or flesh-colored, slightly raised, flat-surfaced, well-demarcated papule of 2 to 5 mm in diameter.  Upon close inspection, these lesions have a surface that is "finely verrucous".  Most often, these lesions affect the hands, legs, or face, and a linear arrangement is not uncommon. At histopathology, flat warts have cells with prominent perinuclear vacuolization around pyknotic, basophilic, centrally located nuclei that may be located in the granular layer. These are referred to as "owl's eye cells."

Additional images

References

External links 

Virus-related cutaneous conditions
Papillomavirus-associated diseases